The Scottish Secondary Teachers' Association (SSTA) is Scotland's second largest teachers' union, created to focus on secondary education issues, in reaction to the perception of national influence exercised by the primary education sector.

The SSTA is affiliated to the STUC and Education International.

Aims
The SSTA aims to:

Advance education in Scotland
Safeguard and promote interests of Scottish secondary teachers in all matters, especially those that affect salaries and conditions of service

To promote these aims, the Association strives to:

Ensure that the secondary view is heard
Formulate policies that reflect views and needs of members
Respond to consultations on educational matters
Represent members and their views to SED, SQA, GTCS, and other national bodies such as SCRE and Learning and Teaching Scotland
Advise members on curricular, professional, and contractual matters
Campaign to maintain educational standards
Negotiate salaries and conditions of service in the SNCT
Campaign for improvement, and against deterioration, in salaries and conditions of service

Past presidents
1944 - J G Lindsey M.A B.Sc F.R.S.E
1945 - James Porter M.A
1947 - W M L Dewar M.A
1949 - Agnes McKendrick M.A
1951 - Alexander Allan M.A
1953 - Alexander R Robertson M.A
1955 - Arthur D Brown B.Com
1957 - James Docherty M.A
1959 - J N C Clark M.A Ph.D
1961 - Albert Anderson M.A B.Sc
1963 - James Miller M.A B.Sc
1965 - David Low B.Sc
1967 - Neil Foggie D.A
1969 - Gladys M Cairns M.A
1971 - John Vallely M.A B.A
1973 - E R Landsman M.A
1975 - L H Inglis Dip.Tech
1977 - J McDRoy D.A
1979 - Alistair B Fulton M.A
1981 - John D Gray M.A M.Sc
1983 - Douglas Campbell M.A
1985 - Donald C Halliday B.Sc
1987 - Thomas Wallace B.Sc
1989 - Ian M Goldsack M.A
1991 - John Small B.Ed
1993 - Marie T Allan M.A
1995 - Barbara E Clark M.A
1997 - W A L Guthrie B.Sc
1999 - William S Fitzpatrick B.A
2001 - G M T Sturrock M.A
2003 - Alan McKenzie M.A
2005 - Albert F S McKay B.Sc
2007 - Ann L Ballinger B.A
2009 - Peter Wright M.A
2011 - Margaret Smith B.A B.Ed
2013 - James B Forbes M.A
2015 - Euan Duncan B.A
2017 - Kevin Campbell B.Sc
2019 - John Guidi B.Sc

See also

Education in Scotland

References

External links
Official website

1944 establishments in Scotland
Trade unions established in 1944
Education trade unions
Educational organisations based in Scotland
Education International
Organisations based in Edinburgh
Trade unions in Scotland
Teacher associations based in the United Kingdom
Secondary education in Scotland